Naranjito may refer to:

Naranjito, Ecuador, a town in Ecuador
Naranjito, Santa Bárbara, a municipality in Honduras
Naranjito, Puerto Rico, a municipality in Puerto Rico
Naranjito, Hatillo, Puerto Rico, a barrio
Naranjito barrio-pueblo, a barrio and municipality seat
Naranjito (mascot), the mascot of the 1982 Football World Cup held in Spain (an orange)